The chief minister of Arunachal Pradesh is the chief executive of the Indian state of Arunachal Pradesh. As per the Constitution of India, the governor of Arunachal Pradesh is the state's de jure head, but de facto executive authority rests with the chief minister. Following elections to the Arunachal Pradesh Legislative Assembly, the governor usually invites the party (or coalition) with a majority of seats to form the government. The governor appoints the chief minister, whose council of ministers are collectively responsible to the assembly. Given that he has the confidence of the assembly, the chief minister's term is for five years and is subject to no term limits. Pema Khandu of the Bharatiya Janata Party is the current incumbent.

List of chief ministers of Arunachal Pradesh

Timeline

Notes

References

External links

 Indian states since 1947

Chief Ministers of Arunachal Pradesh
Arunachal Pradesh, Chief Minister
Chief Ministers